Lamprocephalus is a genus of plants in the groundsel tribe within the sunflower family.

Species
There is only one known species, Lamprocephalus montanus, a rare endemic native to Western Cape Province in South Africa.

References

External links

Endemic flora of South Africa
Senecioneae
Monotypic Asteraceae genera